Car Town was a social network game developed by Cie Games (now Glu Mobile). It allowed users to collect and modify virtual vehicles. The main objective of the game was to win races and build a collection of vehicles. Car Town had many licenses for different brands including the Indy Racing League, which allowed users to collect selected Indy cars; Universal Studios, which gave the game a license to include the DeLorean time machine from the Back to the Future series; and fully customized cars from The Fast and the Furious series. Pirelli World Challenge and the National Hot Rod Association gave the game licenses to include their racing cars such as Funny Cars. Top Gear also gave a license to include their shows and videos, as well as a few exclusive vehicles.

Aside from the aforementioned brands, the game also featured cars from famous motorsports around the world including 24 Hours of Le Mans, World Rally Championship, Formula D, Dakar Rally, FIA GT Series as well as one-make races such as Ferrari Challenge.

Cie Games closed the game on August 29, 2014.

Related versions

Two years after the original's release, Cie released another version of the game named Car Town EX to appeal to Asian users. It added new features that were not seen in the original release of the game. Car Town EX has been discontinued afterwards in February 2014.

Also in 2012, a version of Car Town for iOS, called Car Town Streets, was released. The game's graphics are similar to that of Car Town, but its gameplay is much different. In 2014, an Android OS port came out on the Google Play Store
released by Miniclip. Car Town Streets was closed down in December 2015.

Reception
Car Town received moderate critical praise. One reviewer from Autoblog said that the game made "non-car people become car people", calling it inviting and accessible to newcomers. Bright Hub gave the game a rating of 3/5. Car Town was likened to the Forza Motorsport franchise in terms of customizing vehicles and liveries. Both Car and Driver and Motor Trend, well known automotive magazines, were sponsors of the game, often releasing promo codes and running contests.

Differences
Although they are similar, they have some differences in certain points. For example, the Volkswagen Gol is exclusively available only in Brazilian Portuguese version, and a Honda Prelude is exclusively available only in Car Town EX versions.

References

Facebook games
2010 video games
Browser-based multiplayer online games
Life simulation games
Racing video games
Video games developed in the United States
Video games with isometric graphics
IOS games
IndyCar Series video games
NASCAR video games
Multiplayer and single-player video games